Karguh (also Romanized as Kārgūh; also known as Kārgū) is a village in Gabrik Rural District, in the Central District of Jask County, Hormozgan Province, Iran. At the 2006 census, its population was 35, in 8 families.

References 

Populated places in Jask County